Cadherin-3, also known as P-Cadherin, is a protein that in humans is encoded by the CDH3 gene.

Function 

This gene is a classical cadherin from the cadherin superfamily. The encoded protein is a calcium-dependent cell-cell adhesion glycoprotein composed of five extracellular cadherin repeats, a transmembrane region and a highly conserved cytoplasmic tail. This gene is located in a six-cadherin cluster in a region on the long arm of chromosome 16 that is involved in loss of heterozygosity events in breast and prostate cancer. In addition, aberrant expression of this protein is observed in cervical adenocarcinomas.

Clinical significance 

Mutations in this gene have been associated with congenital hypotrichosis with juvenile macular dystrophy.

Interactions 

CDH3 (gene) has been shown to interact with:
 Beta-catenin, 
 CDH1, 
 Catenin (cadherin-associated protein), alpha 1,
 Nephrin  and
 Plakoglobin.

History 
Cadherin-3 was first described in 1986 by Masatoshi Takeichi's laboratory as a new cadherin molecule most abundant in the developing mouse placenta – hence "P-cadherin".

See also 
 EEM syndrome

References

Further reading

External links